Margot Sikabonyi (née Laura Marguerite Sikabonyi; born 16 December 1982), is an Italian actress.

Biography 
She has a Canadian mother and a Hungarian father. She plays the role of Maria Martini on the Italian TV series Un medico in famiglia. In 2003 she won the Premio Flaiano award Premio all'Interprete (female).

Notes

External links 
 Official site
 

Living people
1982 births
Italian people of Canadian descent
Italian people of Hungarian descent
Actresses from Rome